Koson is a village in Zakarpattia Oblast (province) of western Ukraine.

Geography
The village is located around 20 km northwest of Berehove. Administratively, the village belongs to the Berehove Raion, Zakarpattia Oblast.

History
It was first mentioned as Kozun in 1332.

Population
Nowadays the population includes 2338 inhabitants, mostly Hungarians.

References



Villages in Berehove Raion